Robicheau is a surname.

People with this surname include:

Henri M. Robicheau (September 12, 1838 – May 4, 1923) was a farmer and political figure in Nova Scotia  
Mathurin Robicheau (? – circa 1878) was a farmer and political figure in Nova Scotia Clare 
Frederick Armand Robicheau (1785 – April 18, 1863) was a political figure in Nova Scotia 
Jean-Louis Philippe Robicheau (June 30, 1874 – March 1, 1948) was a farmer

See also

 
 Robichaud
 Robichaux
 Robicheaux